Antonio Agapito "AA" Bautista Legarda Jr. is a Filipino politician. He currently serves as a member of the Philippine House of Representatives representing Antique's at-large congressional district.

He is the younger brother of Senator and then Antique Congresswoman Loren Legarda.

Early life
Legarda was born in Malabon City to parents Antonio Cabrera Legarda and Maria Salome Basilia "Bessie" Gella Bautista. His maternal grandfather was Jose P. Bautista, editor-in-chief of the pre-Martial Law newspaper, The Manila Times, while his maternal grandmother was Carmen Gella Bautista of Pandan, Antique. Legarda's maternal great-grandfather, Ariston Rendon Gella, was a member of the Malolos Congress that crafted the Philippine Constitution of the First Philippine Republic. His great-granduncle Vicente Gella was governor of the province while his great-granduncle was mayor of Sibalom. A brother of his grandfather, Bartolome Gella, also served as governor of Antique.

References

Living people
Year of birth missing (living people)
Politicians from Antique (province)
Members of the House of Representatives of the Philippines from Antique (province)